Phalloptychus is a genus of poeciliids native to eastern and southern Brazil, northern Argentina, Paraguay and Uruguay. The Maximum length for a male is around 2.5cm, while females are around 3.5-4cm at maximum length

Species
There are currently two recognized species in this genus:
 Phalloptychus eigenmanni Henn, 1916
 Phalloptychus januarius (R. F. Hensel, 1868)

References

Poeciliidae
Fish of South America
Freshwater fish genera
Taxa named by Carl H. Eigenmann
Ray-finned fish genera